Shirley Florián (born 27 July 1991) is a Venezuelan female volleyball player. She was part of the Venezuela women's national volleyball team.

She competed with the national team at the 2008 Summer Olympics in Beijing, China, She played with Zulia in 2008.
and at the 2017 FIVB Volleyball World Grand Prix.

Clubs
 Zulia (2008)

See also
 Venezuela at the 2008 Summer Olympics

References

External links 
 http://www.fivb.org/viewPressRelease.asp?No=70316&Language=en

1991 births
Venezuelan women's volleyball players
Place of birth missing (living people)
Volleyball players at the 2008 Summer Olympics
Olympic volleyball players of Venezuela
Living people
20th-century Venezuelan women
21st-century Venezuelan women
Venezuelan emigrants to Puerto Rico
Puerto Rican women's volleyball players
Venezuelan expatriate sportspeople in Puerto Rico
Expatriate volleyball players in Puerto Rico